The following is a list of football stadiums in Mauritius, ordered by capacity.

See also
 List of African stadiums by capacity

References

 
Mauritius
Football
stadiums